Kvarkeno is a rural locality (a selo) and the administrative center of Kvarkensky District, Orenburg Oblast, Russia. Population: 

The fortification was founded in 1842 by settlers from Krasnokholm near Orenburg. After receiving the status of stanitsa, it was named Kvarkeno in honour of the passage of Russian troops through the Kvarken Strait during the Finnish War.

References

Notes

Sources

Rural localities in Orenburg Oblast